Sulfolobus turreted icosahedral virus 1 (formerly Sulfolobus turreted icosahedral virus) is a species of virus that infects the archaeon Sulfolobus solfataricus.



History

This virus was isolated from a hot spring in the Rabbit Creek thermal area which is located in the Midway Geyser Basin of Yellowstone National Park.

Virology

It is an icosahedrally symmetric virus with a unique triangulation number (T) of 31. At the 12 fivefold symmetrical positions of the icosahedron protrude 'turrets' that extend 13 nanometers (nm) above the capsid surface. The turrets have an average diameter of 24 nm. The center of each turret contains a ~3-nm channel. The function of this channel is not known but it may provide access between the interior and exterior of the virion. There appears to be a density at each end of the channel indicating that the channel may be blocked and suggesting a possible regulatory role associated with this density.

There are five structural proteins: a major protein of 37 kiloDaltons (kDa) and several minor proteins with estimated masses of 75, 25, 12.5 and 10 kDa. The major capsid protein is predominantly β-sheeted.

The genome is circular double stranded DNA 17.663 kilobases in length with 36 open reading frames. The genome has a G+C content of 36%.

Unlike other viruses that either lyse or bud from their hosts this virus induces a unique pyramid-like structure on the surface of the host from which it buds.

References

Turriviridae